The 2019–20 Louisiana Tech Bulldogs basketball team represented Louisiana Tech University in the 2019–20 NCAA Division I men's basketball season. The Bulldogs, led by fifth-year head coach Eric Konkol, played their home games at the Thomas Assembly Center in Ruston, Louisiana as members of Conference USA. They finished the season 22–8, 13–5 in C-USA play to finish in a tie for second place. They were set to be the No. 3 seed in the C-USA tournament. However, they C-USA Tournament was canceled amid the COVID-19 pandemic.

Previous season
The Bulldogs finished the 2018–19 season 20–13 overall, 9–9 in C-USA play to finish in 8th place. In the C-USA tournament, they defeated Florida Atlantic in the first round, before falling to top-seeded Old Dominion in the quarterfinals.

Offseason

Departures

Incoming Transfers

Recruiting class of 2019

Roster

Schedule and results

|-
!colspan=12 style=| Exhibition

|-
!colspan=12 style=| Non-conference regular season

|-
!colspan=12 style=| Conference USA regular season

|-
!colspan=9 style=| Conference USA tournament
|-

|-

Source

References

Louisiana Tech Bulldogs basketball seasons
Louisiana Tech Bulldogs
Louisiana Tech Bulldogs basketball
Louisiana Tech Bulldogs basketball